The Belfast East by-election of 19 March 1959 was held after the death of Ulster Unionist Party Member of Parliament Alan McKibbin.

The seat was safe, having been won by Unionists at the 1955 United Kingdom general election by nearly 14,000 votes

Result of the previous general election

Result of the by-election

External links 
A Vision Of Britain Through Time (Constituency elector numbers)

References

1959 elections in the United Kingdom
East
20th century in Belfast
1959 elections in Northern Ireland
March 1959 events in the United Kingdom